Clube Atlético Ubirajá more known as Bira is a Brazilian basketball club locate in Lajeado, in the Rio Grande do Sul State and competes in NBB.

Titles
Rio Grande do Sul State Basketball Championship
 Winners (5): 2006, 2007, 2008, 2011, 2012
Brazilian Cup - South
 Winners (1): 2012

References

Basketball teams in Brazil
Basketball teams established in 1955
Novo Basquete Brasil
1955 establishments in Brazil